Evelyn Carow (born 17 December 1931) is a German movie editor. Working for state-owned production company DEFA, she was closely involved in the production of many films that are now considered classics of East German cinema.

Selected filmography
 Berlin, Schoenhauser Corner (1957)
 Tatort Berlin (1958)
 The Gleiwitz Case (1961)
 I Was Nineteen (1968)
 The Legend of Paul and Paula (1973)
 Solo Sunny (1980)

References

External links
 
 Evelyn Carow on Filmportal.de 

1931 births
Living people
German film editors
Film people from Berlin
German women film editors